Maniyar is a small town in Pathanamthitta district, in Kerala state, India. Maniyar is located on the Pathanamthitta - Seethathodu Road.

Location
Geographically Maniyar is High-range area. Maniyar Dam is located near to the township. It is mainly a Plantation Township. Both state run Kerala State Road Transport Corporation and privately operated buses connect Maniyar to Pathanamthitta City.
Carborundum Universal-a Murugappa Group company has set up power generation plant attached to the dam. This plant has a capacity of 12 MW and extends employment to more than 40 people directly.

Flora and fauna
Maniyar is home to a wide range of birds and wild animals. Hornbills, the engendered birds, are widely seen in this area.

References 

Maniyar Dam - www.c4civil.com
High School Maniyar - www.c4civil.com
Maniyar Devi Temple - www.c4civil.com
Maniyar Church - www.c4civil.com
KAP 5th Battalion Maniyar - www.c4civil.com
Maniyar Rope Bridge - www.c4civil.com

Villages in Pathanamthitta district